K273 or K-273 may refer to:

K-273 (Kansas highway), a former state highway in Kansas
K273BH, a radio station
K.273 Sancta Maria, mater Dei by Mozart (1777)